The 2010 Big Ten men's basketball tournament was played between March 11 through March 14 at Conseco Fieldhouse in Indianapolis, Indiana. It was the thirteenth annual Big Ten men's basketball tournament. The championship was won by Ohio State who defeated Minnesota in the championship game. As a result, Ohio State received the Big Ten's automatic bid to the NCAA tournament. The win marked Ohio State's third tournament championship (one prior championship has been vacated).

Seeds
All Big Ten schools played in the tournament. Teams were seeded by conference record, with a tiebreaker system used to seed teams with identical conference records. Seeding for the tournament was determined at the close of the regular conference season. The top five teams received a first round bye.

Schedule

Bracket

Honors

All-Tournament Team
 Evan Turner, Ohio State – Big Ten tournament Most Outstanding Player
 Demetri McCamey, Illinois
 William Buford, Ohio State
 David Lighty, Ohio State
 Devoe Joseph, Minnesota

References

Big Ten men's basketball tournament
Tournament
Big Ten Conference men's basketball tournament
Big Ten men's basketball tournament
Big Ten